Vincenzo Lanfranchi, C.R. (1609–1676) was a Roman Catholic prelate who served as Archbishop of Acerenza e Matera (1665–1676) and Bishop of Trivento (1660–1665).

Biography
Vincenzo Lanfranchi was born Naples, Italy in 1609 and ordained a priest in the Congregation of Clerics Regular of the Divine Providence.
On 5 May 1660, he was appointed during the papacy of Pope Alexander VII as Bishop of Trivento.
On 17 May 1660, he was consecrated bishop by Marcantonio Franciotti, Cardinal-Priest of Santa Maria della Pace, with Ottaviano Carafa, Titular Archbishop of Patrae, and Stefano Brancaccio, Titular Archbishop of Hadrianopolis in Haemimonto, serving as co-consecrators. 
On 7 Dec 1665, he was appointed during the papacy of Pope Alexander VII as Archbishop of Acerenza e Matera.
He served as Archbishop of Acerenza e Matera until his death on 6 Sep 1676.

References

External links and additional sources
 (for Chronology of Bishops) 
 (for Chronology of Bishops) 
 (for Chronology of Bishops) 
 (for Chronology of Bishops 

17th-century Italian Roman Catholic bishops
Bishops appointed by Pope Alexander VII
1609 births
1676 deaths
Clergy from Naples
Theatine bishops